Eoeugnathus is an extinct genus of prehistoric ray-finned fish belonging to the Halecomorphi. Eoeugnathus existed during the Middle Triassic in what is now Italy, Spain, and Switzerland. The type species is Eoeugnathus megalepis (monotypy).

See also

 Prehistoric fish
 List of prehistoric bony fish

References

Halecomorphi
Triassic bony fish
Prehistoric ray-finned fish genera
Triassic fish of Europe